Abu Silah is a village in Ad Dhahirah Region, in northeastern Oman. The hamlets of Qa`idi and Jufayf are in very close proximity. The village lies along the Muscat Sur Highway (Highway 21) north by road from Mazim. There is also a Wadi Silah flowing through the Ad Dhahirah Region.

References

Populated places in Ad Dhahirah North Governorate